Social localisation (or localization)
(from Latin locus (place) and the English term locale, "a place where something happens or is set") is, like language localization the second phase of a larger process of product and service translation and cultural adaptation (for specific countries, regions or groups) to account for differences in distinct markets and societies, a process known as internationalization and localization.

Objectives 

The main objective of social localisation is the promotion of a demand, rather than a supply-driven approach to localization. It is based on the recognition that it is no longer exclusively the corporations who control the global conversation, but the communities. Social localization supports user-driven and needs-based localisation scenarios - in contrast to mainstream localization, driven primarily by short-term financial return-on-investment (ROI) considerations.

Social localization has been connected to the nonmarket activities of the translation and localisation services sector by researchers reporting to the LINDWEB Conference, organized by the European Commission's DGT as the Language Industry Platform, allowing its stakeholders to meet in Brussels on 24 May 2012. The concept of a 'nonmarket' approach to economics and to societal activities is a well-known concept and has been reported on in the context of the economics of development, education and poverty reduction, for example.

Notes

See also 

 The Rosetta Foundation
 Internationalization and localization
 Globalization
 American and British English differences
 Spanish dialects and varieties
 Variety (linguistics)

References

External links 

 Mozilla Localization Project
 I18nguy: Internationalization (I18n), Localization (L10n), Standards, and Amusements

Translation
Internationalization and localization